Wild Weekend is a studio album by American country singer-songwriter Bill Anderson. It was released in May 1968 on Decca Records and was produced by Owen Bradley. The record was Anderson's ninth studio release to be issued during his recording career. It reached peak positions on the Billboard country albums chart and also produced two singles that became major hits.

Background and content
Wild Weekend was recorded at Bradley's Barn, a studio in Mount Juliet, Tennessee. The sessions took place between 1967 and 1968 under the supervision of producer Owen Bradley. It was Anderson's ninth studio album with Bradley since their first collaboration with his debut record in 1963. Unlike his previous Decca releases, Wild Weekend contained 11 tracks. Two of the album's songs were written by Anderson himself while the remaining songs were written by other artists and songwriters. It also included cover versions of songs previously recorded by others. Among these tracks was Tom Paxton's "The Last Thing on My Mind", the Osborne Brothers's "Rocky Top" and Glen Campbell's "Gentle on My Mind".

Release and reception

Wild Weekend was released in May 1968 on Decca Records. The album was issued as a vinyl record, with six songs on side one and five songs on side two. The album reached number ten on the Billboard Top Country Albums chart in July 1968 and spent a total of 22 weeks on that chart. The album included two singles that also became major hits. Its first single release was "No One's Gonna Hurt You Anymore" in July 1967. By September 1967, the song peaked at number ten on the Billboard Hot Country Singles chart.

The second single issued was the title track in March 1968. The song reached number two on the Billboard country chart in June 1968 after spending 18 weeks on the chart. In later years, Wild Weekend received a review from Allmusic. Writer Eugene Chadbourne gave the studio release 3.5 out of 5 possible stars. Chadbourne called the record a "juxtaposition" to what the title of it entails. "There are record collectors who would acquire this side just to laugh at the cover, since the juxtaposition of the Wild Weekend idea with a photograph of the artist having a bad hair day creates instant belly chuckles. Put the needle on the title track, however, and the laughter will be replaced with looks of awe, especially if the listener is a country fan," he wrote.

Track listing

Personnel
All credits are adapted from the liner notes of Wild Weekend.

Musical personnel
 Bill Anderson – lead vocals
 Harold Bradley – guitar
 Jimmy Colvard – guitar
 Buddy Harman – drums
 Roy Huskey – bass
 The Jordanaires – background vocals
 Jimmy Lance – guitar
 Grady Martin – guitar
 Harold Morrison – banjo
 Hal Rugg – steel guitar
 Jerry Smith – piano
 Buddy Spicher – fiddle

Technical personnel
 Owen Bradley – record producer
 Hal Buksbaum – photography

Chart performance

Release history

References

1968 albums
Albums produced by Owen Bradley
Bill Anderson (singer) albums
Decca Records albums